The Bradford-Huntington House is a historic house at 16 Huntington Lane in the Norwichtown section of Norwich, Connecticut, United States.  The house was built in stages, beginning around 1691, and is one of the oldest to survive in the area.  It was owned by American Revolutionary War officer Jabez Huntington.  It is claimed that Huntington hosted George Washington here.  The house was listed on the National Register of Historic Places in 1970. It is also a contributing property in the Norwichtown Historic District (which was listed on the National Register in 1973).

Description and history
The Bradford-Huntington House is located northeast of the Norwichtown green, on the west side of Huntington Lane.  It stands facing south on a stone foundation, with a large brick fireplace and chimney in the middle of each of two gambrel-roofed wings.  It is  stories in height, with a gambrel-roofed main section and a clapboarded exterior.  The interior has many well-preserved features, including exposed chamfered summer beam, wide floorboards and a winding staircase in the front entry vestibule.

The oldest portion of the house, part of its main block, dates to no later than 1691, when it was described as the "new dwelling house" of John Bradford.  The house was enlarged in stages by members of the Huntington family, who were early settlers of Norwich.  Jabez Huntington, its owner in the late 18th century, was a major general (the highest rank awarded) in the state militia during the American Revolutionary War.  In this role, he is believed to have hosted both George Washington and the Marquis de Lafayette at his home.  The house is of architectural interest for its complex construction history, exhibiting differing construction methods over time.

See also

National Register of Historic Places listings in New London County, Connecticut
List of the oldest buildings in Connecticut

References

External links

Houses on the National Register of Historic Places in Connecticut
Houses completed in 1719
Houses in Norwich, Connecticut
National Register of Historic Places in New London County, Connecticut
Historic district contributing properties in Connecticut
1719 establishments in the Thirteen Colonies